Tree of Smoke is a 2007 novel by American author Denis Johnson which won the National Book Award for Fiction and was a finalist for the Pulitzer Prize. It is about a man named Skip Sands who joins the CIA in 1965, and begins working in Vietnam during the American involvement there. The time frame of the novel is from 1963 to 1970, with a coda set in 1983. One of the protagonists of Tree of Smoke is Bill Houston, who was the main character in Johnson's 1983 debut novel Angels.

There are several references in the novel to the title phrase, which has Biblical origins in three cited passages: Song of Solomon 3:6; Book of Joel 2:30, 31; and Exodus 33:9, 10.

Plot
Tree of Smoke is an American novel about the Vietnam War by Denis Johnson. It primarily follows William "Skip" Sands, a newly minted CIA agent operating in Vietnam during the American insurgency. It also follows James Houston, an infantry private, his brother Bill, and a Canadian nurse named Kathy Jones. The novel moves between 1963 and 1970, setting its epilogue in 1983, in the aftermath of the war. The eponymous Tree of Smoke is a vast collection of index cards containing intelligence collected by Skip's uncle, the WWII war hero and CIA operative Colonel Francis Xavier Sands. 

William "Skip" Sands is a newly-minted member of the CIA Psy Ops team. He is following in the footsteps of his uncle, Colonel Francis Xavier Sands, a hard-drinking WWII war hero and legendary CIA operative. Colonel Sands assigns Skip the daunting task of copying and cross-referencing a huge set of index cards containing information about people, places, and events. The Colonel believes these cards, which he calls the Tree of Smoke, represent vital intelligence that will help the Americans win the war. Skip soon realizes that the information is outdated and useless, but he continues to work on the task.

Skip is sent by his uncle to Mindanao, Philippines to gather intelligence on a priest suspected of gun running. Though Skip finds no such evidence, the priest is nevertheless assassinated by Dietrich Fest, a German assassin contracted by the CIA. Skips believe this murder to be a grave error, but does not mention the Colonel's involvement his report. As a reward and per Skip's request, the Colonel has Skip to the Foreign Language School to learn Vietnamese and he is later reassigned to Vietnam. 

Initially, Skip believes that he will become an important part of the war effort; however, he is assigned to a remote village where he has little contact with anyone other than his two house servants. He is living under an alias where he is supposed to be compiling information about local folklore and fairy tales, as the Colonel believes learning about the local culture will help win the war. Meanwhile, reminiscent of another Colonel - Colonel Kurtz - the Colonel Sands has commandeered a platoon of army infantrymen at a makeshift base called the Landing Zone (LZ). The Colonel, with his henchman Sergeant Jimmy Storm, use their army platoon to map Vietcong tunnels in an operation known as Labyrinth. However, during the Tet offensive, the Colonel's platoon suffers heavy losses, and the Colonel mercy kills a VC POW who is being tortured by the American soldiers. 

The Colonel is stripped of his LZ command, operation Labyrinth is terminated, and he is ordered to return to CIA headquarters - an order which he characteristically ignores. The Colonel, who fancies himself a warrior philosopher, comes under further scrutiny by CIA brass when an incendiary article challenging CIA practices authored by the Colonel is leaked by a subordinate named Voss. It becomes increasing apparent to Skip that the Colonel is becoming unhinged. 

More rogue than ever, Colonel Sands devises a plan to use a double agent to get misinformation in the hands of the Vietcong. Working through a South Vietnamese man named Hao, a disillusioned VC soldier and childhood friend of Hao's named Trung Than, who earlier in the novel fails to assassinate the Colonel, agrees to be that double agent. Colonel Sands orders Skip to use his limited knowledge of the Vietnamese language to learn everything he can about Trung. They spend only a short time together before Colonel Sands learns that the operation has been compromised. He accuses Skip of having passed information on to Voss and their superiors at the CIA (though the real mole is Hao, who is angling to get relocated from Vietnam through any means necessary). Meanwhile, Trung is moved to a small hotel where the assassin Fest is sent to kill him. Jimmy Storm, however, learns of plot and kills Fest, allowing Trung to escape. 

Colonel Sands dies under mysterious circumstances and his legend continues to grow. Skip learns that the CIA now intends to blame him for all the mistakes and illegal activities performed under the Colonel's orders. Another American operative helps Skip escape and disappear for several years. He begins a new, but troubled life, and, in 1983, is eventually found guilty of running guns in Malaysia. He and all the members of his operation are hanged.

The novel concludes with Jimmy Storm, who believes that the larger-than-life Colonel is still alive, on a quasi-mythological quest throughout Southeast Asia to find the Colonel or the truth of his demise. 

While the story of Skip and Colonel Sands provide central narrative, there are several side plots in the novel. Bill and James Houston are half-brothers who are members of the American military during the Vietnam years. They each sporadically send money home to their mother but both wind up spending most of their pay on alcohol and women. Bill returns to the United States earlier than James. He struggles for awhile and spends some time in prison. He seems to be getting his life together by the time James returns to the U.S. Bill sees James going down the same path and is frustrated when James won't listen to reason and winds up in prison.

A nurse named Kathy who is working for a Canadian NGO is widowed at an early age when her husband, a missionary in the Philippines, is killed. She winds up working for an organization that arranges adoptions for Vietnamese orphans. She has a brief affair with Skip and struggles with her faith throughout the novel. 

Hao and Kim are a Vietnamese couple. Hao, whose nephew Minh is a helicopter pilot working for Colonel Sands, aligns himself with Colonel Sands in order to win a relocation out of South Vietnam. However, he soon begins feeding information about the double agent Trung to other CIA agents as well. At the close of the novel, the couple leave Vietnam as payment for his information.

Characters
 Colonel Francis X. Sands – Retired Air Force colonel and war hero. Uncle of Skip Sands and head of Psy Ops for the CIA in Southeast Asia.
 William Skip Sands – CIA officer in Philippines and Vietnam who works under his uncle's tutelage.
 Kathy Jones – Canadian NGO worker in the Philippines and Vietnam.
 James Houston – Marine private in Vietnam. Although not technically under the command of Colonel Sands, he is a member of Echo Reconnaissance of Delta company which is under the direction of Psy Ops.
 Bill Houston – Brother of James Houston who initially serves in the Navy.
 Burris – Youngest brother of James and Bill Houston
 Sergeant Jimmy Storm – Operative for Colonel Sands in Psy Ops.
 Nguyen Hao – Vietnamese businessman serving as driver and operative for Colonel Sands.
 Minh – Nephew of Nguyen and helicopter pilot in the Vietnamese air force but works more directly for Colonel Sands.
 Kim Hao – Wife of Nguyen Hao.
 Thu – Nephew of Nguyen Hao and brother of Minh who kills himself by self-immolation.
 Trung Than – Childhood friend of Nguyen Hao who is a member of the Vietcong but with the help of Nguyen agrees to become a double agent.
 Sergeant Harmon – Commander of James Houston in Cao Phuc who is badly wounded in a firefight.
 Dietrich Fest – German assassin who kills Father Carignan and later attempts to kill Trung Than.
 Father Carignan – Priest in Mindanao who is assassinated for allegedly running guns for the communists.

Reception
Reviews of the book have been mostly favorable.  Tree of Smoke was swiftly cited as one of the Best Books of 2007 by The New York Times, whose reviewer, Jim Lewis, called the book "a massive thing and something like a masterpiece". Time magazine's Lev Grossman named it one of the Top 10 Fiction Books of 2007, ranking it at #5. Grossman praised the book as "the most ambitious novel of the year, and one of the greatest." B. R. Myers, in The Atlantic wrote a highly critical review of both the book and its author, opining that "once we Americans have ushered a writer into the contemporary pantheon, we will lie to ourselves to keep him there."

Tree of Smoke won the 2007 National Book Award
and was a finalist for the 2008 Pulitzer Prize for Fiction.

References

External links
 Slate magazine Book Club Podcast. Critics Meghan O'Rourke, Katie Roiphe, and James Surowiecki discuss the novel Tree of Smoke.

2007 American novels
American spy novels
Farrar, Straus and Giroux books
National Book Award for Fiction winning works
Novels set during the Vietnam War
Novels by Denis Johnson
Novels set in the 1960s
Fiction set in 1963
Fiction set in 1964
Fiction set in 1965
Fiction set in 1966
Fiction set in 1967
Fiction set in 1968
Fiction set in 1969
Fiction set in 1970
Fiction set in 1983